Pleorchis magniporus is a species of flatworm which can parasitize Elasmobranchs, particularly the intestines of the spotted round ray.

References 

Trematodes parasiting fish
Animals described in 1962